The Small Train Robbery (Mala pljačka vlaka) is a Yugoslavian film, a western parody directed by Dejan Šorak and starring Bata Živojinović, Miodrag Krivokapić and Mustafa Nadarević. It was released in 1984.

It reflects to Edwin S. Porter's notable film: The Great Train Robbery.

External links
 
 Zašto komedija 'Mala pljačka vlaka' ima kultni status: Pogledajte film o družini bandita i žandara koji haraju tamo gdje je svejedno tko je RAZBOJNIK, A TKO VLAST 

1984 films
Croatian comedy-drama films
1980s Croatian-language films
Yugoslav comedy-drama films
Ostern films
Films set in 1918
1984 directorial debut films